Adam Karl Wilhelm Nikolaus Paul Eugen von Württemberg (16 January 1792 – 26 July 1847) was a Duke of Württemberg and General in Russian and Polish-Russian service.

Württemberg was born in Puławy to Duke Louis of Württemberg (1756–1817) and Princess Maria Anna Czartoryska (1768–1854). After his parents divorced in 1793 he was raised by his father and, as a nephew of the Russian Empress consort Maria Feodorovna, he was one of the playfellows of the later Tsar Nicholas I of Russia and soon joined the Tsarist Russian Army.
During the occupation of France, in 1815, he was the chief of the army of Würtemberg in the department of Allier.
Throughout the Polish November Uprising of 1830 he commanded the Russian avantguard troops of General Cyprian Kreutz and was defeated on 19 February 1831 by the Polish forces of General Józef Dwernicki prior to the Battle of Olszynka Grochowska.

Württemberg became a lieutenant general and adjutant of Tsar Nicholas I; after his dismissal he returned to Germany, where he died in Langenschwalbach.

Ancestry

References

1792 births
1847 deaths
People from Puławy
Dukes of Württemberg (titular)
Members of the Württembergian Chamber of Lords
German expatriates in Russia